Physicians in the United States Congress have been a small minority of the members of Congress, with fluctuating numbers over the years. The number of physicians serving and running for Congress has risen over the last 50 years from 5 in 1960, down to a nadir of 2 in 1990, to a maximum of 21 in 2013 and a decrease to 14 in 2017. Possible explanations for this development have been increasing health care spending, increased health care reform debate in the United States, leading up to the Healthcare Reform Act.

In public opinion research by the American Medical Association (AMA) from 2013, voters rated "understanding of the problems facing our healthcare industry, including the bureaucratic red tape that is strangling health care providers and driving up the cost of health care for most Americans" as the most convincing statement of a physician candidate for Congress. Physicians in Congress have received large campaign contributions from health care trade associations and from peers through physician associations such as the AMA.

History 
In 1776, 11 percent of signers of the Declaration of Independence were physicians. Likewise two (5 percent) of the 39 individuals crafting the US Constitution in 1787 were physicians. 

During the first 100 years of Congress (1789–1889) 252 (or 4.6 percent) of 5405 members were physicians.

20th and 21st century
The number of physicians serving and running for Congress has risen over the last 50 years from 5 in 1960, down to 3 in 1970 and a nadir of 2 in 1990 up to 10 (2000) to a maximum of 21, including one female physician, in 2013, as of 2015, there were 18, and as of 2017 a small decrease to 15 physicians.

Possible explanations for the increase since the 1990s have been increasing health care spending, increased health care reform debate in the United States, leading up to the Healthcare Reform Act.

Motivations
Tom Coburn said, "physicians have watched the profession undergo tremendous realignments that are shifting doctors' responsibilities away from patient care, changes they attribute to the government's inefficacy". Jim McDermott was quoted as saying "They want to have their hands right there on the handle so they can pull it one way or another." Physicians "balked at the idea of lawmakers with no medical experience making decisions that could upend the profession", per Andy Harris.

Kelley Paul, wife of Rand Paul said in 2015 when he made his 2016 White House bid, "Being a physician gives Rand a unique perspective in Washington, simply because he's trained to diagnose a problem and find a solution."

Party membership
In 2013, three quarters of physicians in Congress were Republican, and 80% as of 2017. As a possible reason Jim McDermott offered, "politically conservative physicians were more likely to chafe at the direction of changes in health care, with greater oversight by the government and a more regulated role for the private sector. It's a fundamental debate about what is in the public good."

During the 2016 cycle the AMA political action committee spent $2 million with "direct contributions to 348 physician-friendly [Congressional] candidates (58% Republican and 46% Democratic)".

Gender, geography and medical specialty
Of the 27 physicians in Congress since 2005, 93% have been men, which is in stark contrast to 70% male physicians in general, 63% were from the South (vs 35% of all Congressional members) and 26% were surgeons (vs 11% of all US physicians).

Public opinion
In 2013, the AMA funded 3 focus groups of voters across the country and an online survey to research public opinion on physicians as Congressional candidates. The top scoring potential message for a physician was to link back to health care expertise "Because physicians work in health care on a daily basis, they bring a clear understanding of the problems facing our healthcare industry, including the bureaucratic red tape that is strangling health care providers and driving up the cost of health care for most Americans."

Candidates, 2014
Senate candidates in 2014 included "an obstetrician in North Carolina, Milton R. Wolf, a radiologist in Kansas, a liver disease specialist in Louisiana, and Representatives Paul Broun and Phil Gingrey in Georgia, all of them Republicans. At least 26 more physicians were running for the House, some for re-election." per a New York Times article from March 2014.

113th Congress (2013–2015)
From 2013 to 2015 there were 20 physicians in U.S.Congress, 19 of whom were male and 16 were members of the Republican party.

† 2009/2012 cycle
††2013–2014 cycle

114th Congress (2015–2017)
From 2015 to 2017, there were 17 physicians in U.S. Congress. All were male and 14 were members of the Republican party.

† 2009/2014 cycle

115th Congress (2017–2019)
From 2017 to 2019 there were 16 physicians in U.S. Congress, all were male and 14 were members of the Republican party. There was also one podiatrist, one dentist, and one optometrist.

116th Congress (2019–2021)

117th Congress (2021–present)
There are 17 physicians in the 117th Congress, of which 13 serve in the House and 4 serve in the Senate.

Physicians in political positions outside Congress
Civilian:
 United States Assistant Secretary for Health

Uniformed service, United States Armed Forces:
 Surgeon General of the United States, overall head of the "Commissioned Corps"
 United States Public Health Service Commissioned Corps (PHSCC), the "Commissioned Corps"

References

External links
"Physicians in the Senate" United States Senate, accessed May 28, 2015
 National Council of Physician Legislators Alliance for Patient Access, accessed 7 June 2018

Physicians
 
Health policy in the United States